Foster is an unincorporated community in Boone County, West Virginia, United States. Foster has a post office with ZIP code 25081.

References

Unincorporated communities in Boone County, West Virginia
Unincorporated communities in West Virginia